NGC 3749 is a spiral galaxy located in the constellation of Centaurus at an approximate distance of 130.52 million light-years. NGC 3749 was discovered in 1835 by John Herschel.

References

External links
NGC 3749 on SIMBAD

Spiral galaxies
Centaurus (constellation)
3749
Astronomical objects discovered in 1835
035861